Chusan may refer to:

Zhoushan, also known as Chusan, archipelago-city in Zhejiang, China
Zhoushan Island, also known as Chusan Island, the main island of the archipelago-city Zhoushan in Zhejiang, China
Capture of Chusan, 1840
Capture of Chusan (1841)
SS Chusan, British ocean liner and cruise ship
Chusan Palm (Trachycarpus fortunei), a palm native to central China